The Three Elenas (Spanish: Las tres Elenas) is a 1954 Mexican drama film directed by Emilio Gómez Muriel and starring Amelia Bence, Manolo Fábregas, and Domingo Soler.

The film's sets were designed by the art director Manuel Fontanals.

Cast
 Amelia Bence as Doña Elena Ugalde de Dueñas  
 Manolo Fábregas as Luis Araiza  
 Domingo Soler as Don Víctor Ugalde  
 Ramón Gay as Manolo Dueñas  
 Anabelle Gutiérrez as Elena, nieta  
 Sara Guasch as Doña Sofía  
 Jaime Fernández as Pablo  
 María Gentil Arcos as María  
 Martha Valdés as Esther  
 Alicia Caro as Elena Dueñas, hija 
 Roberto Corell as Cliente casa de juego 
 Emilio Garibay as Jugador  
 Jesús Gómez as Jugador 
 Salvador Lozano as Doctor  
 Pepe Martínez 
 Lucrecia Muñoz as Soledad, sirvienta  
 Ignacio Peón as Invitado a fiesta  
 José Pidal as Abogado  
 Fanny Schiller as Olimpia

References

Bibliography 
 Emilio García Riera. Historia documental del cine mexicano: 1953-1954. Universidad de Guadalajara, 1997.

External links 
 

1954 films
1954 drama films
Mexican drama films
1950s Spanish-language films
Films directed by Emilio Gómez Muriel
Mexican black-and-white films
1950s Mexican films